Sacesinians were an ancient people who fought for the Persians in Alexander the Great's war of conquest on the Achaemenid Empire.  They gave horsemen to the Persians which were used together with the horsemen of Caucasian Albania.  They lived in the north east of Armenia along the Kura river.

References
 

Iranian_nomads
Ancient_peoples